The Delecroix was a Belgian automobile. First built in 1897, but commercialised in 1898, it was a light car with a rear-mounted engine and a suspension-less tubular frame.

In 1899, the company started building a model with places for carrying four people. It had a single-cylindre 3.5 hp engine.

A small car with a 2-cylinder De Dion engine was also built. This had the added advantage over many of its contemporaries of having the capability to drive backwards.

See also
De Wandre, manufactured around 1923, and known as "the elegant spider"

References
David Burgess Wise, The New Illustrated Encyclopedia of the Automobile

1890s cars
Defunct motor vehicle manufacturers of Belgium

Cars introduced in 1897